The Legacy Walk is an outdoor public display on North Halsted Street in Chicago, Illinois, United States, which celebrates LGBT contributions to world history and culture. According to its website, it is "the world's only outdoor museum walk and youth education program dedicated to combating anti-gay bullying by celebrating LGBT contributions to history." It is the world's largest collection of bronze biographical memorials.

Inductees (all are featured on bronze memorials)

History
The Legacy Project was conceived at the National March on Washington for GLBT Civil Rights in 1987. The advent of the NAMES Project AIDS Memorial Quilt, the first recognition of what would become National Coming Out Day (October 11), the first Act Up civil disobedience at the U.S. Supreme Court, and the simple experience of being at the March itself inspired the Legacy Walk's creators to propose an outdoor LGBT history installation that would leap-frog over the education system which failed to acknowledge and teach about LGBT contributions to world history and culture. The City of Chicago became the logical site because, in 1991, it had established the first Gay and Lesbian Hall of Fame to recognize the contributions of Chicago's LGBT community; and because, in 1998, the City of Chicago had dedicated the "Rainbow Pylon" streetscape on North Halsted Street  to define the cultural and business nexus of Chicago's LGBT community. The dedication of the rainbow pylon streetscape brought to an end the eleven-year search for a site to house the outdoor museum. Planning for the Legacy Walk's creation and fundraising for its launch took 13 years. The inaugural dedication of the Legacy Walk's first eighteen bronze memorials took place on National Coming Out Day, October 11, 2012 – exactly 25 years to the day that the idea was first conceived. Each year on the anniversary of its creation, additional bronze memorials are added.

Today 
As of 2019 the Legacy Walk consists of thirty-eight bronze memorials, each of which is digitally linked to a cloud-based system accessed either by scanning a QR Code or by activating a microchip on each marker with Near Field Communication technology. This opens a portal in users' smartphones to watch video and download education resources. The Legacy Walk is joined by its cousin – the traveling "Legacy Wall" – which began a state-wide tour in 2015. In 2017 the Legacy Wall began a national tour that has taken LGBT contributions to world history and culture on the road by visiting libraries, high school and university campuses, cultural institutions, civic plazas, and corporate headquarters across the country.

See also
Center on Halsted
Chicago LGBT Hall of Fame
LGBT culture in Chicago
Boystown

References

External links
 http://www.legacyprojectchicago.org/

2012 establishments in Illinois
LGBT culture in Chicago
LGBT events in Illinois
LGBT monuments and memorials in the United States